Hajj Ebrahim Deh (also Romanized as Ḩājj Ebrāhīm Deh; also known as Ḩājīebrāhīmdeh) is a village in Divshal Rural District, in the Central District of Langarud County, Gilan Province, Iran. At the 2006 census, its population was 222, in 65 families.

References 

Populated places in Langarud County